The 2019 Men's Summer Universiade Volleyball Tournament was the 30th edition of the event, organized by the Summer Universiade. It was held in Naples, Italy from 5 to 13 July 2019.

Pool standing procedure
 Number of matches won
 Match points
 Sets ratio
 Points ratio
 If the tie continues as per the point ratio between two teams, the priority will be given to the team which won the last match between them. When the tie in points ratio is between three or more teams, a new classification of these teams in the terms of points 1, 2 and 3 will be made taking into consideration only the matches in which they were opposed to each other.
Match won 3–0 or 3–1: 3 match points for the winner, 0 match points for the loser
Match won 3–2: 2 match points for the winner, 1 match point for the loser

Preliminary round
All times are Central European Summer Time (UTC+02:00)

Pool A

|}

Pool B

|}

Pool C

|}

Pool D

|}

Final round

17th–20th places

17–20th place semifinals

|}

19th place match

|}

17th place match

|}

9th–16th places

9–16th place quarterfinals

|}

13–16th place semifinals

|}

9–12th place semifinals

|}

15th place match

|}

13th place match

|}

11th place match

|}

9th place match

|}

1st–8th places

Quarterfinals

|}

5–8th place semifinals

|}

Semifinals

|}

7th place match

|}

5th place match

|}

3rd place match

|}

Final

|}

Final standing

Medalists

References

Men
Universiade